The following lists events that happened in 1999 in Libya.

Incumbents
President: Muammar al-Gaddafi
Prime Minister: Muhammad Ahmad al-Mangoush
April 5, 1999: Libya hands over two suspects--each reportedly linked to Libyan intelligence--to Dutch authorities for trial in the bombing of Pam Am Flight 103.

 
Years of the 20th century in Libya
Libya
Libya
1990s in Libya